"Así me gusta a mí" is a song recorded by Chimo Bayo. Recorded in Rager Studio, the single was released on 24 June 1991. The song, which became a generational icon of the so-called "" in Spain, also earned Bayo international fame, reaching number one in Israel and Japan. Sales surpassed 1 million in more than 40 countries. In addition to the Spanish-language lyrics, featuring a play on words on ecstasy, non-lexical vocables such as "¡Hoo! ¡Hoo ha! ¡Hea hoo! Chiquitan chiquitan tan tan…" are uttered throughout the song. It was produced by German Bou.

Chimo Bayo eventually released a wine label named "Hu-Há" ('Hoo Ha'), after the non-lexical vocable.

References 

1991 songs
Spanish-language songs